A list of films produced by the Marathi language film industry based in Maharashtra in the year 1983.

1983 Releases
A list of Marathi films released in 1983.

References

Lists of 1983 films by country or language
 Marathi
1983